General Michael Jackson (18 December 1734 – 10 April 1801) was a soldier from Massachusetts.

Early life

Jackson was born in Newton, Province of Massachusetts and served in the French and Indian War as a lieutenant.  He married Ruth Parker, daughter of Ebenezer Parker, on January 31, 1759.

American Revolution

In the American Revolutionary War he was captain of a minuteman company and took part in the final part of the Battles of Lexington and Concord, harassing the British retreat to Boston. He was wounded at the Battle of Bunker Hill.   He served as the major of the Gardner's Regiment of the Massachusetts line from June 3, 1775 to December 31, 1775.

He was lieutenant colonel of the 16th Continental Infantry from January 1 to December 31, 1776.   He was seriously wounded in the attack on Montresor's Island, New York on September 23, 1776.

He was promoted to colonel in the Massachusetts Line on January 1, 1777 and given command of the 8th Massachusetts Regiment the same date.  He was transferred to the 3rd Massachusetts Regiment on June 12, 1783 and commanded it until it was mustered out of service later that year.

On September 30, 1783 he received a brevet (honorary promotion) to brigadier general and finished his country's service as a general under George Washington and the Continental Army on November 3, 1783. He was one of the very few individuals to have served in the Continental Army for the entirety of its existence - from its inception in June 1775 to its disbanding in November 1783.

Jackson was admitted as an original member of The Society of the Cincinnati in the state of Massachusetts when it was established in 1783.

He died in 1801 in Newton, Massachusetts.

Family

His five brothers and five sons, including Michael Jackson Jr., also all served in the war. The family granted some farm lands in its possession to Harvard University to help found the institution.

After the Revolutionary War, some members of the famous, mostly doctors, Jackson family moved to Madison, WI, where they helped establish city institutions including Methodist Hospital and the Jackson Clinics, now Meriter Hospital and two of them married into the Hobbins family, which like them included doctors and surgeons, bank founders, and well known business leaders. Madison's Dr. Will Hobbins served in the infamous Wisconsin Eagle Brigade as asst Doctor Surgeon, with Brother in Law Surgeon James A. Jackson and Quartermaster Colonel James Mears. Will's older brother Dr. Joseph Hobbins served at Camp Randall as Union Chief Doctor Surgeon in charge at Camp Randall, and at the end of the war, treating 1400 Confederate soldiers captured on the Mississippi at Island 11 at Camp Randall at the end of American Civil War. These men sought to establish the University of Wisconsin's first medical college (a 1st effort that failed), founded the Wisconsin Horticulture Society and Madison Literary Club, President and Doctor Surgeons founding Wisconsin's St George's Society under charter approved by the Wisconsin Legislature.
Other Hobbins' offspring founded many of the state capital's first banks, such as the American Exchange Bank (1st German Bank (Fred Suhr) merger) with many preserved historic family homes on Mansion Hill. James R Hobbins, son of Mary and Joseph W. Hobbins traveled to Butte, MT with his nephew John Suhr Hobbins who married a local girl, Margaret Perham, and return to Madison as 1st Cashier at the American Exchange Bank, later to become Vice President with older brother Wm Suhr Hobbins as President. James R. Hobbins started as post hole digger for Anaconda and later became CEO of the corporation, CEO of Union Pacific Railroad and sit on the Board of Governors for the New York Federal Reserve. 
In the early 1900s, Mary (Mears) Hobbins (married Joseph William Hobbins son of Will Hobbins) promoted, fought for, raised funds and founded the city's first hospital Madison General Hospital, and founded the Badger Chapter of the American Red Cross.

A book detailing the Jackson Hobbins blood lines, 300 Years American, by Alice F. and Bettina Jackson chronicles some of these sons and daughters of the American Revolution dating from Jamestown to the 1950s.

References

Purcell, L. Edward. Who Was Who in the American Revolution. New York: Facts on File, 1993. .
Heitman, Francis B.  Historical Register of Officers of the Continental Army.  Washington, D.C. 1914. pg. 316.
Appleton's Encyclopedia
Jackson, Alice F. and Bettina. Three Hundred Years American: The Epic of a Family (1951). State Historical Society of Wisconsin

External links
 The Society of the Cincinnati
 The American Revolution Institute

1734 births
1801 deaths
Continental Army officers from Massachusetts
People of Massachusetts in the French and Indian War
People from Newton, Massachusetts
People of colonial Massachusetts